Vale da Trave is a village in the civil parish of Alcanede, municipality of Santarém, Portugal.

Villages in Portugal